The Institute of Mass Communication Film and Television Studies (IMCFTS) is an institute of mass communication, journalism and film studies in Prince Anwar Shah Road, Kolkata. It is  affiliated with Kalyani University and is approved by the University Grants Commission.

Institutional objective
The institution was created by Pabitra Sarkar (ex-vice chancellor of Rabindra Bharati University and Vice-Chairman, West Bengal State Council for Higher Education) in the year 2002 in Kolkata, West Bengal. It is primarily a non-profit organization whose main aim is to provide education in the fields of journalism and mass communication, coupled with film studies, as per the institute's stated objective.

Courses offered
 MA in Mass Communication and Community Journalism (2 years)
 B.A. (Honors) in Media Studies
 PG diploma in Mass Communication and Journalism (1 year)
 PG diploma in Film and Television Studies (production-based)
 Practical Training FaCilities on Journalism
 Videography and Non-linear Editing Training
 Event Management and PR (Public Relations) Course

Governing body
The governing body consists of people from the West Bengal council of Higher Education, Calcutta University, Jadavpur University, Netaji Subhas Open University, Visva Bharati University, Doordarshan etc. The details are available on the website of the institute.

Memberships
The institute has an institutional membership with British Council, India and associate membership with the Indus Foundation, USA.

Recent development
From 2011, a new batch of MA in Mass Communication and Community Journalism has been started in the institute. The course is actually of 2010 but due to delays in getting the Kalyani University clearance, the launching of the course had to be postponed.

See also

References

External links
https://www.youtube.com/watch?v=WvsaqQe1mMs&t=710s
 https://web.archive.org/web/20120301165259/http://www.klyuniv.ac.in/list_colleges.html
 http://www.infinitecourses.com/InstituteDetails.aspx?Institute=Institute-of-Mass-Communication-Film-and-Television-Studies-%28IMCFTS%29&InstituteID=23
 http://imcftstimes.blogspot.com/
 http://www.infinitecourses.com/journalism-mass-communication-colleges-in-kolkata.aspx
 http://www.topmbaindia.com/MBA-Institute-College.aspx?Institute=Institute-of-Mass-Communication-Film-and-Television-Studies-%28IMCFTS%29&ID=23
 
 
University of Kalyani
University Grants Commission
National Assessment and Accreditation Council

Indian journalism organisations